The Anglican Church of St John the Baptist in Horsington, Somerset, England was built in the 15th century and rebuilt between 1885 and 1887. It is a Grade II* listed building.

History

The church was built in the 15th century and fragments, particularly the north wall of the nave remain from that date, however most of the church was rebuilt in a Victorian restoration during the 1880s.

In 2015 part of the floor was replaced and new toilet and servery was installed.

The parish is part of the Abbas and Templecombe, Henstridge and Horsington benefice within the Diocese of Bath and Wells.

Architecture

The stone building has hamstone dressings and clay tile roofs. It has a five-bay nave and three-bay chancel with a south aisle. The west tower is supported by diagonal corner buttresses. The uppermost stage was added in 1738 while the lower stages are from the 15th and 16th centuries.

Inside the church is an octagonal font from around 1400 however most of the interior is from the 19th century including the stained glass window by Charles Eamer Kempe.

See also  
 List of ecclesiastical parishes in the Diocese of Bath and Wells

References

Grade II* listed buildings in South Somerset
Grade II* listed churches in Somerset
Church of England church buildings in South Somerset